Mike Tyson Mysteries is an American adult animated television series, and is the first collaboration between Warner Bros. Animation and Williams Street. It premiered October 27, 2014 on Adult Swim. The series features Mike Tyson solving mysteries, in the style of I Am the Greatest: The Adventures of Muhammad Ali, Scooby-Doo, Jonny Quest, and Mister T. On December 10, 2014, Adult Swim renewed the series for a second season, which premiered on November 1, 2015. A third season premiered on May 14, 2017, and the remaining Season 3 episodes aired from March 4, 2018, to May 13, 2018.  A fourth season aired in Summer 2019 and early 2020.

During a May 2020 interview, writer Larry Dorf revealed the show had not been renewed and the fourth season would be its last. Adult Swim has aired reruns as of 2022.

Premise 
The show follows the fictional misadventures of boxer/actor Mike Tyson, the ghost of the Marquess of Queensberry, Tyson's adopted daughter, and an alcoholic talking pigeon, as they solve mysteries around the world. The style of the show borrows heavily from the 1983–86 Ruby-Spears produced Mister T featuring actor/wrestler Laurence Tureaud as himself as well as 1970's Hanna-Barbera productions such as Scooby-Doo, Where Are You! and The Funky Phantom. Targeted at a much older demographic than those children-oriented cartoons, the show contains adult language and concepts in the manner of Family Guy, South Park, and many other Adult Swim shows. While each episode involves a mystery as a framing device, they are often ignored entirely while the plot takes a completely different (and often oddball) direction as the mysteries are rarely solved and episodes sometimes end on cliffhangers that are never resolved.

Characters

Main characters 
 Mike Tyson (voiced by himself) – The title character of the series, Mike Tyson is a retired boxer who now solves mysteries. He is portrayed as being wildly out of touch with reality, confusing a chess Grandmaster with the Grand Wizard of the Ku Klux Klan, or Elon Musk with Elton John, thinking a binary code spells out 'Ooo', and eating junk food without realizing he's on a diet. He has a reputation for doing unusual things like taking an oatmeal bath with cooked oatmeal, owning a pet grizzly bear, and using mosquitoes to help him sleep, along with pronouncing the names of many other characters incorrectly, even by calling his own daughter Yang or Yee instead of Yung.
 Tyson also appears in live-action form during the end credits.
 Pigeon (voiced by Norm Macdonald) – An alcoholic, sexually depraved, sarcastic pigeon. He is a former human who was turned into a pigeon by his ex-wife as a curse for cheating on her. His real name is revealed to be Richard, although everyone still calls him Pigeon – his full name is later revealed to be "Richard Pigeon". Pigeon is disliked by Marquess and Yung Hee, but Tyson is seemingly oblivious to his obnoxious nature. Pigeon is Yung Hee's biological father from a one-night stand, although Pigeon keeps this information to himself on learning it after observing how close Mike and Yung Hee are.
 Yung Hee Tyson (voiced by Rachel Ramras) – Mike's adopted panromantic asexual daughter. Born in 1998, she was left by her birth mother on Mike's doorstep when she was a baby. A running gag in the series is Yung being repeatedly mistaken for a boy. 
 Marquess of Queensberry (voiced by Jim Rash) – The deceased real-life father of modern boxing, John Douglas, the Marquess of Queensberry, is an alcoholic and flamboyant ghost who provides Mike with intellectual advice. The Marquess portion of his name is pronounced "Marcus" and rendered as if it is his actual name, instead of a title.
 Deezy (voiced by Chuck Deezy; main season 4, recurring seasons 1–3) – Mike Tyson's agent, whom he infrequently attempts to fire but find himself unable to due to a fear of direct confrontation.

Recurring characters 
 Bert (voiced by Hugh Davidson) – A foul-mouthed NYC limousine driver.
 Carol (voiced by Jill Matson-Sachoff) – Mike's short-term wife. 
 Jillian Davis (voiced by Cheryl Hines) – A Newport Beach socialite. 
 Terry (voiced by Rhys Darby) – The good-natured New Zealander who tends Mike's swimming pool.
 Maxine (voiced by Rachael Harris) – The owner of the Don’t Judge a Book antique store, and a confidant of Marquess's.
 Delvin (voiced by David Hoffman or Larry Dorf) – The mild mannered manager of Munn's Supermarket. 
 Harold Feder (voiced by Kevin Ruf) – Mike's attorney and Yung's godfather.

Episodes

Home media
The first season was released on DVD on October 20, 2015, by Warner Bros. Home Entertainment. The second season was released on DVD on September 27, 2016, exclusively through Warner's online store and Amazon.com.

Reception 
The series has received mostly positive reviews from critics. The show currently holds an 82% rating on Rotten Tomatoes based on 11 reviews, with its consensus being: "A dizzying whirl of lowbrow and high-concept, Mike Tyson Mysteries should more than satisfy fans of Adult Swim's signature blend of animated silliness." On Metacritic, the show has a score of 75 out of 100 based on 6 reviews, indicating "generally favorable" reviews.

Cancellation 
In a May 2020 podcast interview, writer Larry Dorf confirmed that the fourth season would be its last, although Davidson, Ramras, and Dorf would continue working together on a new project for Warner Bros.

International release 
In Canada, Mike Tyson Mysteries was exclusively available on Netflix until June 30, 2022.

See also 
 Mister T, A cartoon about the real-life actor Mr. T and his team of kids that go around the world solving mysteries.
 I Am the Greatest: The Adventures of Muhammad Ali, another animated series about a professional boxer.
 Jackie Chan Adventures, similar fictionalized animated series about actor and professional martial artist, Jackie Chan.
 Major Lazer, similar fictionalized animated adventure series about musical group, Major Lazer.

Notes

References

External links 

 
 
 
 

2014 American television series debuts
2020 American television series endings
2010s American adult animated television series
2010s American black cartoons
2010s American mystery television series
2020s American adult animated television series
2020s American black cartoons
2020s American mystery television series
American adult animated action television series
American adult animated comedy television series
American adult animated mystery television series
English-language television shows
Adult Swim original programming
Animation based on real people
Boxing animation
Cultural depictions of Mike Tyson
Television series by Warner Bros. Animation
Television series by Williams Street